Nati is a surname. Notable people with the surname include:
Germano Nati (1946–2008), Eritrean politician
Kimiora Nati (born 1988), New Zealand rugby league player
Romolo Nati (born 1968), Italian architect and businessman
Valerio Nati (born 1956), Italian professional boxer

Surnames